Ramusculus subulatus is a species of air-breathing land snail, a terrestrial pulmonate gastropod mollusk in the family Enidae.

Distribution 
This species is endemic to the Crimea (Ukraine).

References

Enidae
Gastropods described in 1837